The 2nd Canadian Infantry Brigade was a formation of the Canadian Army that served in both World War I and World War II. The brigade fought on the Western Front during World War I, and in Sicily and Italy during the Second World War. In both wars, the brigade formed part of the 1st Canadian Division.

The brigade was first commanded from its formation in September 1914 to September 1915 by Arthur Currie.

Order of Battle

World War I 

 5th Battalion (Western Cavalry), CEF. August 1914 – November 11, 1918;
 6th Battalion (Fort Garrys), CEF. August 1914 – December 1914 (Became Canadian Cavalry Depot);
 7th Battalion (1st British Columbia), CEF. August 1914 – November 11, 1918;
 8th Battalion (90th Winnipeg Rifles), CEF. August 1914 – November 11, 1918;
 10th Battalion (Canadians), CEF. January 1915 – November 11, 1918.

World War II 
 Princess Patricia's Canadian Light Infantry
 The Seaforth Highlanders of Canada
 The Loyal Edmonton Regiment
 2nd Canadian Infantry Brigade Ground Defence Platoon (Lorne Scots)

References 

Infantry brigades of the Canadian Army
Canadian World War I brigades
Canadian World War II brigades
Military units and formations established in 1914
Military units and formations disestablished in the 1940s